The Bishop of Kildare was an episcopal title which took its name after the town of Kildare in County Kildare, Ireland. The title is no longer in use by any of the main Christian churches having been united with other bishoprics. In the Roman Catholic Church, the title has been merged with that of the bishopric of Leighlin and is currently held by the Bishop of Kildare and Leighlin. In the Church of Ireland, the title has been merged with that of the bishopric of Meath and is currently held by the Bishop of Meath and Kildare.

History
In the 5th century, the Abbey of Kildare was founded by Saint Brigid, a double monastery of nuns and monks. The abbey was governed by an abbess, who was the 'heir of Brigit' (comarbae Brigte), and by abbots, bishops and abbot-bishops, who were subordinate to the abbess.

Although the bishopric was founded with the abbey in the fifth century, it wasn't until 1111 AD that the diocese of Kildare was established at the Synod of Rathbreasail. The diocese covered roughly the northern part of County Kildare and the eastern part of County Offaly.

After the episcopate of Walter Wellesley (1529–1539), there were parallel apostolic successions. In the Church of Ireland, Kildare continued as an independent diocese until 1846 when it amalgamated with Dublin and Glendalough to form the united Diocese of Dublin, Kildare and Glendalough. In 1976, Kildare broke away from Dublin and Glendalough and combined with Meath to form the current united Diocese of Meath and Kildare. The Roman Catholic bishopric of Kildare too remained separate until it linked with the bishopric of Leighlin. The bishops of Kildare had been apostolic administrators of Leighlin since 1683 and the union of the two sees was formally decreed on 29 November 1694.

Pre-Reformation bishops

Monastic bishops of Kildare

Diocesan bishops of Kildare

Post-Reformation bishops

Church of Ireland succession

Roman Catholic succession

See also

 Church of Ireland Diocese of Meath and Kildare
 Roman Catholic Diocese of Kildare and Leighlin
 Kildare Cathedral

Notes

  Thomas Leverous was bishop of both successions when they were briefly reunited in the reign of Queen Mary I.

References

Bibliography

External links
Diocese of Kildare at kildare.ie

Religion in County Kildare
Kildare
Kildare
 Bishop
Former Roman Catholic bishoprics in Ireland
Bishops of Kildare or Ferns or Leighlin or of Ossory